Hold Me Tight is a 2010 Danish drama film directed by Kaspar Munk. It was the director's first film.

Synopsis
Sara, Mikkel, Louise, and Hassan are four teenagers whose lives are thrown into chaos one day when a misunderstanding cascades into a series of events that will mark each one of them in their own way.

Cast and characters
 Julie Brochorst Andersen as Sara
  as Mikkel
 Sofia Cukic as Louise
  as Hassan
 Wili Julius Findsen as Jonas
 Charlotte Fich as Sara's mom
 Bjarne Henriksen as Mikkel's dad
 Helene Egelund as Mikkel's mom

Reception
Variety said the film "is a classic example of what happens when bad scripts tackle good subjects". The film has a few powerful scenes smothered by stereotypes along with "one of the most spectacularly misconceived endings in memory".

References

External links
 

2010 drama films
2010 films
Danish drama films
2010s Danish-language films